The 2007 California wildfire season saw at least 9,093 separate wildfires that charred  of land. Thirty of those wildfires were part of the Fall 2007 California firestorm, which burned approximately 972,147 acres (about 3,934 km2, or 1,520 mi2) of land from Santa Barbara County to the U.S.–Mexico border. At the peak of the wildfire activity in October 2007, the raging wildfires were visible from space.

The wildfires killed a total of 17 people, with nine of them dying directly from the fires; 203 others were injured, including at least 124 firefighters.

California Governor Arnold Schwarzenegger declared a state of emergency in seven California counties where fires were burning. President George W. Bush concurred, and ordered federal aid to supplement state and local response efforts. Over 6,000 firefighters worked to fight the blazes; they were aided by units of the United States Armed Forces, United States National Guard, almost 3,000 prisoners convicted of non-violent crimes, and 60 firefighters from the Mexican cities of Tijuana and Tecate. The fires forced approximately 1,000,000 people to evacuate from their homes, becoming the largest evacuation in California's history.

Major contributing factors to the extreme fire conditions were drought in Southern California, hot weather, and the unusually strong Santa Ana winds, with gusts reaching 112 mph (180 km/h). California's "fire season," which traditionally runs from June to October, has become a year-round threat, due to a mixture of perennial drought and the increasing number of homes built in canyons and on hillsides, surrounded by brush and forest.  

The fires had numerous sources. Several were triggered by power lines damaged by the high winds. One fire started when a semi-truck overturned. Another was suspected as having been deliberately caused; the suspect was shot and killed in flight by state authorities. A 10-year-old boy admitted that he accidentally started the Buckweed Fire by playing with matches. Causes of the remaining fires remain under investigation. The last active fire of the October 2007 fires, the Harris Fire, was fully extinguished on November 16, 2007, about 27 days after the series of wildfires had begun to ignite. The October 2007 wildfires collectively caused over $2 billion in property damages.

During the season, the National Interagency Fire Center reported that two firefighters were killed. One died in a helicopter crash, and the second was killed in a bulldozer rollover.

Fires 
Below is a list of all fires that exceeded  during the 2007 fire season. The list is taken from CAL FIRE's list of large fires.

Notes

October 2007 wildfires

Wind and weather

The record drought was exacerbated by the seasonal Santa Ana winds, blowing at an abnormally high strength. This combination of wind, heat, and dryness turned the chaparral into fire fuel. Officials believed that some of the fires generated their own winds, similar to the Oakland firestorm of 1991. The effects of the smoke were felt as far away as Brentwood in the East Bay, near Stockton, where it impacted local weather. High-speed Santa Ana winds also rendered the use of dropping water from fire fighting aircraft inefficient: until such winds abate, most payloads of water are just dispersed by the wind over an area so large that the water evaporates before it can reach a large fire on the ground.

The San Diego Union-Tribune reported, At one point, swirling winds threatened to bring fire into densely populated urban areas. At the height of the Santa Ana winds on October 22, sustained wind speeds reached , with wind gusts up to  reported.

Impact

On October 21, the Harris Fire damaged and disabled the Southwest Power Link, a 500,000-volt power line from Arizona to San Diego. Power outages were reported in Los Angeles, Orange, San Diego, and other counties on October 22 to 333,500 Southern California Edison customers, most being restored within 24 hours. The power outage also affected the areas of Ojai, Oxnard, Simi Valley, Santa Clarita, Thousand Oaks, Agoura Hills, Rialto, Fontana, San Bernardino, Rancho Cucamonga, Mira Loma, Hesperia, Corona, Bloomington, Irvine, Calimesa and Rubidoux. This outage also caused 230 people to be without power in Malibu. The California Independent System Operator Corp declared an energy transmission emergency in southern California on October 23, due to wildfires affecting the lines. 500,000-, 230,000- and 138,000-volt lines were disabled in San Diego, and some lines in other areas were also disabled. 24,992 people lost power, due to the lack of power from the power grid. During the crisis, Mexico provided power to help augment the electrical needs of the San Diego area.

Authorities have stated that the evacuations, which displaced more than 900,000 people, have been the largest evacuation number in the history of California. By mid-morning on October 22, 2007, thousands of evacuees were taking shelter in Qualcomm Stadium and other locations throughout San Diego. On the afternoon of October 22, 2007, the Marines evacuated some planes from Marine Corps Air Station Miramar to other military bases in California and Arizona. The Navy moved all non-essential personnel from Naval Base San Diego barracks onto nearby vessels to accommodate refugees. The San Diego Wild Animal Park moved some animals to the on-site animal hospital for their protection.

The Horno Fire had charred  in Camp Pendleton by 4:00 A.M PDT, on October 24, 2007. It caused the closure of Interstate 5 and it also caused Amtrak California to stop Pacific Surfliner service between Oceanside and San Clemente. Traffic was being diverted to Interstate 15, which had itself been closed earlier.
Illegal migrant workers were endangered by the crisis, sometimes staying at work in the fields within mandatory evacuation zones. Many had lived in the canyons nearby and distrusted officials. When fleeing the fires, some were arrested, while others were turned away from shelters due to lack of adequate identification. Some Mexican firefighters expressed concern about their countrymen, while others felt the migrant workers were aware of the risks they were taking. coyotehowls

Only a few cases of looting were documented. Six people were arrested for stealing supplies from Qualcomm stadium, another was arrested for theft after being found in possession of stolen goods in the Jamul fire area, and two were arrested near the Tecate border crossing.

Air quality and effects on health 
The concentration of particulate matter 10 micrometers and smaller (designated PM10) reached unhealthy levels as a result of the fires. PM10 particles are small enough to enter deep into the lungs, and possibly the bloodstream. San Diego city attorney Michael Aguirre, citing concerns over weather conditions and air quality, urged the city to consider a voluntary evacuation of the entire city.

Response

Government agencies and volunteers worked together to mitigate the effects of the fires. According to the state of California's Consolidated Response web page, "There are 17 active fires in Southern California. The priority for fighting fires as of 19:30 on October 21 were the Buckweed, Witch, Harris, Canyon, Ranch, Santiago, and Sedgewick Fires." March Air Reserve Base is the primary staging area for relief supplies as coordinated by the Federal Emergency Management Agency.

With many businesses and schools closed, some people used their time off to help others. Officials estimated that 10,000 people were gathered at Qualcomm Stadium, the largest shelter point in San Diego. Besides food, blankets and water, volunteers provided toys for children, massages, and a live rock and roll band performance. CERT teams, in various cities, received their first activation since the program's inception in this region. Trained volunteers provided assistance ranging from coordinating relief, to acting as a fire department auxiliary.  Religious groups such as Victim Relief Ministries, Giving Children Hope, Hope Force International, Apostolic World Relief, and the Salvation Army responded by opening places of worship, donating supplies, and feeding workers and evacuees.

The Department of Defense contributed twelve engines for firefighting efforts. The National Guard called more than 2,400 troops, with 17,000 available if needed; of which 100 California National Guard medical personnel provided medical assistance. Six crews from the Navy's Helicopter Sea Combat Squadron 85 based at Naval Air Station North Island were assigned to battle the Witch Creek fire. They flew MH-60 Seahawk helicopters equipped with a 420-gallon water bucket and they were the only local Navy teams trained to fight fires from the air. Marine Corps Air Station Miramar contributed several aircraft as well as fire fighting trucks to operations based in Ramona. One of the larger airtankers, the Martin Mars, sent through a private contract from its home in Port Alberni, British Columbia on October 25, landing on Lake Elsinore in Riverside County, California. It has a 7,000 gallon capacity. Two other airtankers and their crews from Quebec worked on the fires, part of an annual three-month contract with the state of California.

California Governor Arnold Schwarzenegger declared a state of emergency in seven California counties where fires burned. President George W. Bush concurred and visited the region on Thursday, October 25, 2007.

Rep. Duncan Hunter criticized state fire officials for delaying the use of Marine helicopters until CalFire spotters were in position to coordinate their efforts. However, California Fire Marshal Kate Dargan said that the Marines and officials at CalFire were following procedures worked out with the military after serious problems with air coordination during the 2003 California wildfires. Other state officials also praised the federal response. Aaron McLear, a spokesman for Schwarzenegger, said the governor "is getting everything he needs from the federal government".

NBC Nightly News reported that with the evacuations reaching about 950,000 people, this was the largest peacetime movement of Americans since the Civil War era, although similar evacuation figures were cited for Hurricane Rita and Hurricane Katrina.

On November 6, 2007, the state of California reported that the fires were under control. On November 9, the last vole of wildfires were finally contained. According to the state's consolidated report on the fires, Governor Arnold Schwarzenegger "called on the Blue Ribbon Task Force to assess the next steps to take at federal, state and local levels of government to prevent and fight future fires. Additionally, the Governor asked the task force to review the Governor’s Blue Ribbon Fire Commission’s recommendations, generated after the 2003 fires, to evaluate if the recommendations are still the best and most effective ways in preventing and fighting fires."

See also
List of California wildfires

FIRESCOPE

References

External links

Maps
 CalFire map 
 LA Times managed Google map showing fire locations and relevant information
 MSNBC managed Virtual Earth map showing fire locations
 KPBS managed Google map with detailed San Diego area information
San Diego County map showing evacuated areas
 CBS 8: San Diego fire maps
 Orange County Register detailed map of Santiago fire

Academics and research
 MAP.SDSU.EDU - mapping, database and geographic information system for the 2003 and 2007 fires, managed by the San Diego GIS force group, and hosted by San Diego State University
 The San Diego Fire Recovery Network - a Southern California organization which addresses the widespread ecosystem changes in San Diego County caused by the 2003 and 2007 wild fires
 The GIS Data Center for San Diego Fire Recovery Network - hosted by San Diego State University
 Let Malibu Burn: A political history of the Fire Coast by Mike Davis
 2007 Southern California Wildfires Web Archive at the California Digital Library.

 
California, 2007
Wildfires in California by year